Kristin Landen Davis (also listed as Kristin Lee Davis; born  February 23, 1965) is an American actress and producer. She is known for playing Charlotte York Goldenblatt in the HBO romantic comedy series Sex and the City (1998–2004). She received nominations at the Emmys and the Golden Globes in 2004 for her role as Charlotte, and reprised the role in the films Sex and the City (2008) and Sex and the City 2 (2010), as well as the spin-off show And Just Like That... (2021–present).

Davis's big break came in 1995, when she was cast as the villainous Brooke Armstrong in the Fox prime time soap opera Melrose Place (1995–1996). Her film credits include The Shaggy Dog (2006), Deck the Halls (2006), Couples Retreat (2009), Journey 2: The Mysterious Island (2012) and Holiday in the Wild (2019). Davis made her Broadway debut playing Mabel Cantwell in the 2012 revival of The Best Man, and her West End debut playing Beth Gallagher in the original 2014 stage production of Fatal Attraction.

Early life and education
Davis was born in Boulder, Colorado. She is an only child, and her parents divorced when she was a baby. She was adopted by her stepfather, then-University of Colorado Boulder professor Keith Davis, after he married her mother, Dorothy, a university data analyst, in 1968. She has three half sisters from her father's first marriage. Early in her childhood, she and her parents moved to Columbia, South Carolina, where her father served as provost and taught psychology at the University of South Carolina.

Davis wanted to be an actress from the age of 9, when she was cast in the Workshop Theatre production of Snow White and the Seven Dwarfs. Davis lived in South Carolina until she graduated from A.C. Flora High School in 1983. She then moved to New Jersey, where she attended Rutgers University. Davis graduated with a BFA degree in acting from Rutgers University's Mason Gross School of the Arts in 1987.

Career

Television
After graduation in 1987, Davis moved to New York and waited tables before opening a yoga studio with a friend. In 1991, she acted in a couple of episodes of the daytime drama (soap opera) General Hospital. She later guest-starred on Dr. Quinn, Medicine Woman and ER, and acted on made-for-television movies. Her big break came in 1995 when she landed the role of villainess Brooke Armstrong Campbell on the Fox nighttime soap opera Melrose Place. She left the show after one year when producers decided to kill off the character. The following year, Davis guest-starred in two episodes of Seinfeld.

In 1998, Davis was cast as Charlotte York in the HBO romantic comedy series Sex and the City and remained an integral cast member until the series ended in 2004. In 1999, along with the rest of the cast, she was awarded the Women in Film Lucy Award in recognition of her excellence and innovation in her creative works that have enhanced the perception of women through the medium of television. She received Primetime Emmy Award nomination for Outstanding Supporting Actress in a Comedy Series her role as Charlotte in the final season, and well as Golden Globe Award for Best Supporting Actress – Series, Miniseries or Television Film nomination. During her time in show, Davis guest-starred on Friends in episode "The One with Ross's Library Book", and Will & Grace episode "Will & Grace & Vince & Nadine". She played leading roles in the 1999 miniseries Atomic Train alongside Rob Lowe, and television movies including Blacktop (2000), Three Days (2001) and The Winning Season (2004).

Davis hosted the VH1 show 200 Greatest Pop Culture Icons in 2003. In 2005, she starred in a television pilot entitled Soccer Moms in which she and Gina Torres star as suburban mothers who moonlight as private detectives. She starred as Miss Spider in the animated television series Miss Spider's Sunny Patch Friends and was a guest judge on the Lifetime program Project Runway.

In 2012, Davis starred and produced in the Lifetime television film Of Two Minds In 2014, she returned to series television with starring role in the short-lived CBS sitcom Bad Teacher. In 2016, she starred in Hallmark Channel film A Heavenly Christmas. In 2020, she hosted Fox reality series Labor of Love.

Films
Davis made her movie debut in the 1987 comedy slasher film Doom Asylum. In 1990s, she had secondary roles in films Nine Months (1995) and Sour Grapes (1998).  Her later films include The Adventures of Sharkboy and Lavagirl in 3D (2005), opposite David Arquette and George Lopez; the 2006 version of The Shaggy Dog, opposite Tim Allen, and Deck the Halls, opposite Matthew Broderick and Danny DeVito.

Davis appeared in 2008's Sex and the City feature film, under the direction of executive producer Michael Patrick King. The film was a box office success and amassed $415 million at the worldwide box office, despite mixed reviews. It was Davis first movie to reach #1 at the US box office. Davis reprised her role of Charlotte York a second time in 2010's Sex and the City 2, which grossed $290 million worldwide but was widely panned by critics. She remained interested in a third installment of the franchise.

In 2009, Davis co-starred in the romantic comedy film Couples Retreat, a comedy chronicling four couples who partake in therapy sessions at a tropical island resort. Jon Favreau, who also co-wrote the script, played her husband. The film opened at No. 1 during its opening weekend at the US box office, making it her second film to do so. In 2010, Davis was cast as the mother of Josh Hutcherson's character in the adventure movie Journey 2: The Mysterious Island. The film opened theatrically in February 2012 and passed the $100 million mark at the US box office, being Davis' third film to achieve this.

In 2015, Davis was credited as producer on the documentary Gardeners of Eden, that comments on the illegal ivory trade. In 2019, Davis starred in and produced romantic comedy-drama film Holiday in the Wild for Netflix. The film was pitched to her, after the producers had noticed her philanthropic work with elephants. She later played a leading role and produced the 2021 thriller film Deadly Illusions about a bestselling female novelist (Davis) who is suffering from writer's block and hires an innocent young woman to watch over her twin children.

Stage
Davis made her Broadway debut in July 2012, when she replaced Kerry Butler in the revival of Gore Vidal's The Best Man at the Gerald Schoenfeld Theatre. She made her West End debut playing Beth Gallagher in Fatal Attraction at the Theatre Royal, Haymarket, in March 2014.

Additional ventures
Shortly after the wide release of the Sex and the City feature film, in June 2008, Belk, the nation's largest privately owned department store chain, announced a partnership with Davis. The arrangement includes a ladies' apparel and accessories line that debuted in 2008 in 125 store locations and online, with eventual plans for expanding availability to other store locations. In Belk's press release about the product line launch, Davis cited her upbringing in South Carolina as part of her inspiration for working with the chain. In late 2009 Belk cancelled the arrangement, citing the difficult economic conditions prevailing, while Davis said she hoped to take the line elsewhere.

Philanthropic work and recognition
Davis is a Global Ambassador for Oxfam, and has campaigned in support of their work since 2004, travelling to locations including Haiti, Mozambique, and South Africa. In 2011 she gave a tearful interview with BBC News describing the situation at the Dadaab refugee camp in Kenya where she witnessed the impact of drought.

The cosmetics company Maybelline named Davis as a celebrity spokeswoman in 2004.

During her 2009 visit to Africa, Davis, a lifelong lover of elephants, discovered an abandoned baby elephant and arranged for it to be taken to a wildlife rehabilitation center. In recognition of the attention she has brought to the plight of orphaned African elephants, Davis won the Humane Society's 2010 Wyler Award, which is bestowed on a celebrity or public figure who has made news on behalf of animals. She is also a patron of the David Sheldrick Wildlife Trust which works to protect elephants and other wildlife in Kenya.

Davis has worked with the United Nations High Commissioner for Refugees (UNHCR) and is included on their list of "High Profile Supporters". In 2015 she visited the Democratic Republic of Congo and Uganda. Davis later filmed a fund-raising appeal supporting the UNHCR, and in 2016 visited Australia to promote the UNHCR's work, focussing on the plight of women victims of sexual violence in Congo.

Personal life
In 2011, Davis adopted a daughter, Gemma Rose Davis. In 2018, she adopted a son, Wilson. They reside in the hills of Brentwood, Los Angeles, California.

She is a recovering alcoholic and says she was introduced to alcohol early as part of her Southern upbringing: "Alcohol freed me. I was really shy and I didn't know how to come out of my shell. I drank for the same reason I loved acting. I wanted to feel things and express myself and be free. And I'm not naturally that way."

Filmography

Film

Television

Theatre

References

External links

 
 
 Barnes and Noble biography
 
 

1965 births
Living people
Actresses from Boulder, Colorado
Actresses from South Carolina
American adoptees
American film actresses
American stage actresses
American television actresses
American voice actresses
Actresses from Columbia, South Carolina
Rutgers University alumni
20th-century American actresses
21st-century American actresses
A.C. Flora High School alumni